Sadat Bukari (born 12 April 1989, in Wa) is a Ghanaian former professional footballer who played as a centre forward or secondary striker. He last played for Churchill Brothers in the I-League.

Career 
Bukari's transfer from Ghanaian team Heart of Lions to Tunisian team Étoile du Sahel. With Sahel, he won the 2008 CAF Confederation Cup. In the summer of 2012 he signed with the Romanian club Astra Giurgiu.

International
Bukari also played for Ghana in the 2005 FIFA U-17 World Championship in Peru. 
Under 20 national team
Olympique National team 
2 cups in senior national team

Honours
Étoile du Sahel
CAF Super Cup: 2008
CAF Confederation Cup: 2008
2007–08 Tunisian Ligue Professionnelle 1
Tunisian Cup: Runner-up 2007-08

Maccabi Haifa
Israeli Premier League:2009–10

Astra Giurgiu
Cupa României: 2013–14
Supercupa României: 2014

References

External links

1989 births
Living people
Ghanaian footballers
Association football forwards
Heart of Lions F.C. players
Étoile Sportive du Sahel players
Maccabi Haifa F.C. players
Hapoel Ashkelon F.C. players
US Monastir (football) players
FC Astra Giurgiu players
Al-Shoulla FC players
Liga I players
Saudi First Division League players
Saudi Professional League players
Israeli Premier League players
Ghanaian expatriate footballers
Expatriate footballers in England
Expatriate footballers in Tunisia
Expatriate footballers in Israel
Expatriate footballers in Romania
Ghanaian expatriate sportspeople in England
Ghanaian expatriate sportspeople in Tunisia
Ghanaian expatriate sportspeople in Israel
Ghanaian expatriate sportspeople in Romania
People from Upper West Region
Expatriate footballers in India
Churchill Brothers FC Goa players
I-League players